Parabhritika is a 1947 Bengali film. The film was directed by Bidhayak Bhattacharya and it was made under P. N. Gangopadhyay Production banner. Bimal Chattopadhyay composed music of this film.

Plot

Cast 
 Amar Choudhury
 Jiban Gangopadhyay
 Tulsi Lahiri
 Nilima Das
 Sarajubala
 Amita Bose
 Chitra Debi
 Kamala Adhikari
 Tara Bhaduri
 Aranya Ray
 Dhiresh Majumdar
 Jiban Mukhopadhyay
 Maya Singha
 Nakul Dutta
 Shibshankar Sen
 Siddheswar Bhattacharya

See also 
 Kuhelika

References

External links 
 Parabhritika at CITWF

1947 films
Bengali-language Indian films
1940s Bengali-language films
Indian black-and-white films